Old Thompson is a brand of blended American whiskey produced by Barton Brands, which has been owned by the Sazerac Company since 2009. It is known for its low price among brands of American whiskey. The company refers to it as "an excellent value". The brand dates back to 1904, when it was introduced by the Glenmore Distillery Company, which at the time was owned by the brothers James Thompson and Francis P. Thompson.

Today it is a blended whiskey bottled at 40% alcohol by volume (80 U.S. proof), and formulated from a mixture of 80% neutral grain spirits and 20% straight whiskeys.

Assessment

Higher quality categories of American whiskey sold in the market, such as straight whiskeys, are not allowed to contain added neutral grain spirits.

Under the U.S. Code of Federal Regulations for American whiskey, a blended American whiskey is required to contain at least 20% straight whiskeys, and Old Thompson is formulated according to this minimum requirement.

The minimum alcohol concentration allowed under the U.S. Code of Federal Regulations for American whiskey is 40%, and Old Thompson is also formulated according to this minimum requirement.

There is no aging requirement under the U.S. Code of Federal Regulations for American whiskey for the neutral grain spirits in an American blended whiskey, although there is a two-year minimum aging requirement for straight whiskey (and for the straight whiskey used in the mixture from which a blended whiskey is formulated) and there is a requirement for an age statement on the label of a blended whiskey containing neutral spirits in cases where the straight whiskey used in the blend is less than 4 years old. A labeling age statement on American blended whiskey that contains neutral spirits (per Title 27, Part 5, Subpart C, Section 5.40) ordinarily refers only to the age of the 20% content of the product that is the straight whiskey used within the blend, and the neutral grain spirits used in the blend may not have been aged. The company web site for Old Thompson refers to it as "4 Year Old Blended American Whiskey", and the picture of the label itself on the web site does not show an age statement, so Old Thompson is formulated from 20% 4 year old straight whiskey and 80% (un-aged) neutral spirits.

The company web site for Old Thompson says that it is "Blended from the finest quality bourbons available", so some of the straight whiskey that is used in the blend is bourbon. The picture of the label on the web site does not contain a reference to bourbon. Possibly, not all of the straight whiskey used in the Old Thompson blend is bourbon (although bourbon is among the least expensive straight whiskeys to produce).

When comparing an American whiskey such as Old Thompson to whiskeys produced in other countries, it is important to keep in mind that the regulations governing American whiskey production differ from those in other countries. In some regards, the U.S. regulations are relatively strict. For example, there is no minimum percentage requirement for using some amount of higher quality (straight) whiskey in Canadian, Scotch, or Irish blended whiskey production, and as a result, such non-American whiskeys may often be made using a substantially higher percentage of neutral or near-neutral spirits. The one substantial way in which such other countries are more strict than the U.S. is in the aging requirement, which is set at a minimum of 3 years in Canada, Scotland, and Ireland.  Under U.S. law, there is no requirement for aging of neutral grain spirits when these are used in a blended whiskey.

External links
Old Thompson official web page

References

Whiskies of the United States
Sazerac Company brands